Frederick Ray Banks (born May 26, 1962) is a former professional American football wide receiver in the National Football League. He played eight seasons for the Cleveland Browns (1985), the Miami Dolphins (1987–1993), and the Chicago Bears (1993).

References

1962 births
Living people
Players of American football from Columbus, Georgia
American football wide receivers
Chowan Hawks football players
Liberty Flames football players
Cleveland Browns players
Miami Dolphins players
Chicago Bears players